Part 3 is the fourth studio album by the funk and disco group KC and the Sunshine Band. The album was produced by Harry Wayne Casey and Richard Finch and was released in October 1976 on the TK label.

History
Part 3 contains three of the band's biggest hits, "(Shake, Shake, Shake) Shake Your Booty", "I'm Your Boogie Man", and "Keep It Comin' Love".  The first two reached number 1 on the Billboard Hot 100 while the third peaked at number two. Two other singles, "I Like to Do It" and "Wrap Your Arms Around Me" found moderate success on the charts.

Record World said of "I Like to Do It" that "What this group likes to do is race up the charts and as long as they continue to produce material such as this, they should remain on top."

The album was remastered in 1994 as “Part 3…And More” with additional bonus tracks.

The album was remastered and reissued with bonus tracks in 2012 by Big Break Records.

Track listing

Personnel
Harry Wayne Casey – keyboards, vocal
Jerome Smith – guitar
Richard Finch – bass guitar, drums, percussion
Robert Johnson – drums
Fermin Goytisolo – percussion
Oliver C. Brown – percussion
Ken Faulk – trumpet
Vinnie Tanno – trumpet
Mike Lewis – tenor saxophone
Whit Sidener – baritone saxophone
Beverly Champion – background vocals
Margaret Reynolds – background vocals
Jeanette Williams – background vocals

References

External links
 Part 3 at Discogs

1976 albums
KC and the Sunshine Band albums
TK Records albums